Hemiexarnis is a genus of moths of the family Noctuidae.

Selected species
Hemiexarnis berezskii 
Hemiexarnis moechilla (Püngeler, 1906)
Hemiexarnis nivea 
Hemiexarnis peperida

References
Natural History Museum Lepidoptera genus database

Noctuinae